Germán Ezequiel Pacheco González (born 19 May 1991) is an Argentine professional footballer who plays for Deportivo Morón as a forward. He also holds Spanish citizenship.

Club career
Born in Buenos Aires, Pacheco started playing with Club Atlético Vélez Sarsfield, but moved with his parents to Spain still in his teens, where he finished his formation with Atlético Madrid. In the 2009–10 season he had his first taste of professional football, being loaned to neighbouring Rayo Vallecano in the second division; however, the loan was short-lived, as he returned in January 2010 to the Colchoneros, spending the following months with its reserves in the third level.

On 8 June 2010, Pacheco returned to his native country as Atlético loaned him for one year to Club Atlético Independiente. He made his Primera División debut against his first youth club Vélez, on the first fixture of the 2010 Apertura; in addition, even though he did not play any game in the tournament, he was part of the 2010 Copa Sudamericana-winning team.

For the second half of the 2010–11 campaign, Pacheco was loaned to Gimnasia y Esgrima La Plata. In the following years he competed mainly in the Peruvian Primera División with Unión Comercio and Juan Aurich, also having a brief loan spell back in Spain, with division two side Córdoba CF.

In December 2016, Pacheco returned to Peru and its top tier, signing with Alianza Lima from Thai League T1's Ratchaburi Mitr Phol FC. He marked his debut the following 12 February with a goal from a free kick, in a 2–0 home win against Club Universitario de Deportes.

Honours
Independiente
Copa Sudamericana: 2010

References

External links

1991 births
Living people
Argentine people of Spanish descent
Citizens of Spain through descent
Argentine emigrants to Spain
Footballers from Buenos Aires
Argentine footballers
Association football forwards
Argentine Primera División players
Segunda División players
Segunda División B players
Peruvian Primera División players
Malaysia Super League players
German Pacheco
Bolivian Primera División players
Ukrainian Premier League players
Club Atlético Vélez Sarsfield footballers
Club Atlético Independiente footballers
Club de Gimnasia y Esgrima La Plata footballers
Atlético Madrid B players
Rayo Vallecano players
Córdoba CF players
FC Karpaty Lviv players
Unión Comercio footballers
Juan Aurich footballers
Club Alianza Lima footballers
Club Deportivo Universidad César Vallejo footballers
Sri Pahang FC players
German Pacheco
Fortaleza Esporte Clube players
Alianza Universidad footballers
Deportivo Morón footballers
Argentine expatriate footballers
Expatriate footballers in Spain
Expatriate footballers in Ukraine
Expatriate footballers in Peru
Expatriate footballers in Malaysia
Expatriate footballers in Thailand
Expatriate footballers in Brazil
Expatriate footballers in Bolivia
Argentine expatriate sportspeople in Spain
Argentine expatriate sportspeople in Ukraine
Argentine expatriate sportspeople in Peru
Argentine expatriate sportspeople in Malaysia
Argentine expatriate sportspeople in Thailand
Argentine expatriate sportspeople in Brazil
Argentine expatriate sportspeople in Bolivia